Usha Kiran Khan (Ushākiraṇa Khāna and other variants, born 1945) is a writer who works in the Hindi and Maithili languages. She is also a retired academic historian.

Career
Of her writing influences, Usha said: "My great idol and role model for my inclination towards Maithli language is the noted writer and novelist Nagarjun. He has penned many novels, stories and poems and Maithli language and also he has been my guru from whom I have learned the beauty of this language" and "Nagarjun is like father like figure to me and his style of writing has always influenced me a lot."

Personal life
Usha Kiran khan is married to Ram Chandra Khan, who served the Indian Police Service from 1968 to 2003, and has four children.

Awards and honours
In 2011, Usha won a Sahitya Akademi Award for the Maithili novel Bhamati: Ek Avismaraniya Premkatha. The award is presented by Sahitya Akademi, India's National Academy of Letters.

In 2012, she was awarded a Kusumanjali Sahitya Samman by the Indian Council for Cultural Relations for her novel Sirjanhaar. This was the first year that the awards had been given and they included a purse of Rs.2,50,000.

Khan was awarded the Padma Shri in 2015 for her service in the field of literature and education.

References

Further reading
Devakānta Jhā (2004). A History of Modern Maithili Literature: Post-independence Period, Sahitya Akademi Publications, ppg. 199, 241-242, 251, etc.

External links
Dr. Usha Kiran Khan, Kusumanjali Sahitya Samman 2012

Living people
Maithili writers
Hindi-language writers
Recipients of the Padma Shri in literature & education
Year of birth missing (living people)